Piskorzyna  is a village in the administrative district of Gmina Wińsko, within Wołów County, Lower Silesian Voivodeship, in south-western Poland.

The name of the village is of Polish origin and comes from the word piskorz, which means "weatherfish".

References

Villages in Wołów County